Henry Mortimer Billings (May 16, 1806February 6, 1862) was an American farmer and pioneer of the U.S. state of Wisconsin.  He was a member of the first session of the Wisconsin State Senate and later served in the Wisconsin State Assembly, representing Iowa County.

Biography

Born in Schaghticoke, New York, Billings moved to Galena, Illinois, in 1828 and then to Michigan Territory settling in Iowa County. In 1838, Billings served in the Wisconsin Territorial House of Representatives. In 1848, he served in the first session of the Wisconsin State Senate and later represented Iowa County in the Wisconsin State Assembly in 1858.

Billings was dragged to death in a sleigh accident near his home in Avoca. He is buried at Calvary Cemetery in Cobb.

Electoral history

Wisconsin Lieutenant Governor (1861)

| colspan="6" style="text-align:center;background-color: #e9e9e9;"| General Election, November 5, 1861

References

External links

|-

1806 births
1862 deaths
People from Schaghticoke, New York
People from Iowa County, Wisconsin
Members of the Wisconsin Territorial Legislature
Members of the Wisconsin State Assembly
Wisconsin state senators
People from Galena, Illinois
19th-century American politicians
Wisconsin pioneers